Tortricosia pallidexcisa is a moth in the subfamily Arctiinae. It was described by Jeremy Daniel Holloway in 2001. It is found on Borneo.

The length of the forewings is about 10 mm.

References

Moths described in 2001
Cisthenina